Sandycroft is a village in Flintshire, Wales, approximately  southeast of Queensferry and  southwest of Chester, on the B5129 road between Queensferry and Broughton. The community population taken at the 2011 census was 6,724.

Railway station
Sandycroft railway station was opened in 1884, and was served by the North Wales Coast Line for 77 years until its closure under the Beeching Axe in 1961.

Geography
The village is part of the Deeside conurbation and is located immediately south of the River Dee, which is canalised at this point between Chester and the Dee Estuary. It is accessible from the A494 via the Queensferry Interchange.

A large industrial estate lies to the north of the village, expanded in 2018 with the addition of a manufacturing site for Ifor Williams Trailers. The site was opened on 22 September 2018 by Ken Skates AM.

Notable people
Sasha, DJ (born 1969)

References

Villages in Flintshire